Thunderbird is an album by saxophonist Willis Jackson which was recorded in 1962 and released on the Prestige label.

Reception

Allmusic awarded the album 4½ stars stating "Right from the title track opener, it's apparent that Jackson's heading straight for basic soul-jazz".

Track listing 
 "Thunderbird" (Willis Jackson) – 5:06  
 "Oh, Lady Be Good" (George Gershwin, Ira Gershwin) – 5:28  
 "Back and Forth" (Jackson, Bill Jennings) – 9:16  
 "California Sun" (Henry Glover, Morris Levy) – 3:53  
 "Body and Soul" (Frank Eyton, Johnny Green, Edward Heyman, Robert Sour) – 7:55  
 "A Penny Serenade" (Darren Halifax, Melle Weersma) – 7:44

Personnel 
Willis Jackson – tenor saxophone
Freddie Roach – organ  
Bill Jennings – guitar 
Wendell Marshall – bass
Frank Shea – drums
Ray Barretto – congas

References 

Willis Jackson (saxophonist) albums
1962 albums
Prestige Records albums
Albums recorded at Van Gelder Studio
Albums produced by Esmond Edwards